Generalized pencil-of-function method (GPOF), also known as matrix pencil method, is a signal processing technique for estimating a signal or extracting information with complex exponentials. Being similar to Prony and original pencil-of-function methods, it is generally preferred to those for its robustness and computational efficiency.

The method was originally developed by Yingbo Hua and Tapan Sarkar for estimating the behaviour of electromagnetic systems by its transient response, building on Sarkar's past work on the original pencil-of-function method. The method has a plethora of applications in electrical engineering, particularly related to problems in computational electromagnetics, microwave engineering and antenna theory.

Method

Mathematical basis
A transient electromagnetic signal can be represented as:

where

  is the observed time-domain signal,
  is the signal noise,
  is the actual signal,
  are the residues,
  by the identities of Z-transform, 
  are the damping factors and
  are the angular frequencies.

,

Generalized pencil-of-function estimates the optimal  and 's.

Noise-free analysis

 

where  is defined as the pencil parameter.  and  can be decomposed into the following matrices:

where

 

If , the generalized eigenvalues of the matrix pencil

Then, the generalized eigenvectors  can be obtained by the following identities:

    
    

where the  denotes the Moore–Penrose inverse, also known as the pseudo-inverse. Singular value decomposition can be employed to compute the pseudo-inverse.

Noise filtering

 

where  is the noisy data. A singular value decomposition on  yields:

Superscript  denotes the conjugate transpose.

Then the parameter  is chosen for filtering. Singular values after , which are below the filtering threshold, are set to zero; for an arbitrary singular value , the threshold is denoted by the following formula:

,

Filtered  and  matrices are obtained as:

Prefiltering can be used to combat noise and enhance signal-to-noise ratio (SNR). Band-pass matrix pencil (BPMP) method is a modification of the GPOF method via FIR or IIR band-pass filters.

GPOF can handle up to 25 dB SNR. For GPOF, as well as for BPMP, variace of the estimates approximately reaches Cramér–Rao bound.

Calculation of residues
Residues of the complex poles are obtained through the least squares problem:

Applications
The method is generally used for the evaluation of Sommerfeld integrals in discrete complex image method for method of moments, where the spectral Green's function is approximated as a sum of complex exponentials. Additionally, the method is used in antenna analysis, S-parameter-estimation in microwave integrated circuits, wave propagation analysis, moving target indication and radar signal processing.

See also
Generalized eigenvalue problem
Matrix pencil
Prony's method

References

Signal processing
Computational electromagnetics
Radar signal processing
Estimation theory
Articles containing proofs
Signal estimation